In SCSI computer storage, computers and storage devices use a client-server model of communication.  The computer is a client which requests the storage device to perform a service, e.g., to read or write data.  The SCSI command architecture was originally defined for parallel SCSI buses but has been carried forward with minimal change for use with Fibre Channel, iSCSI, Serial Attached SCSI, and other transport layers.

In the SCSI protocol, the initiator sends a SCSI command information unit to the target device.  Data information units may then be transferred between the computer and device.  Finally, the device sends a response information unit to the computer.

SCSI commands are sent in a  command descriptor block (CDB), which consists of a one byte operation code (opcode) followed by five or more bytes containing command-specific parameters.  Upon receiving and processing the CDB the device will return a status code byte and other information.

The rest of this article contains a list of SCSI commands, sortable in opcode or description alphabetical order.  In the published SCSI standards, commands are designated as "mandatory," "optional" or "vendor-unique."  Only the mandatory commands are required of all devices.  There are links to detailed descriptions for the more common SCSI commands. Some opcodes produce different, though usually comparable, effects in different device types; for example, opcode  recalibrates a disk drive by seeking back to physical sector zero, but rewinds the medium in a tape drive.

SCSI command lengths
Originally the most significant 3 bits of a SCSI opcode specified the length of the CDB.  However, when variable-length CDBs were created this correspondence was changed, and the entire opcode must be examined to determine the CDB length.
The lengths are as follows:

List of SCSI commands
When a command is defined in multiple CDB sizes, the length of the CDB is given in parentheses after the command name, e.g., READ(6) and READ(10).

External links
Summary of SCSI command operation codes

SCSI